Yeap Cheng Eng (1915 – 14 January 1994) was a Chinese footballer. He was the first Malayan ever to participate in the Olympic Games, when he was a member of the football team which represented the China as a guest players in the 1948 Olympic Games in London.

In Malayan domestic football, he represented Penang for a record 24 years and was their captain for many years, winning the Malaya Cup in 1953, 1954, and 1958 (at the age of 42).

References

External links
 Profile at the Penang State Government

Malaysian people of Chinese descent
Footballers at the 1948 Summer Olympics
Malaysian footballers
Olympic footballers of China
Chinese footballers
China international footballers
1915 births
1994 deaths
Association football forwards